Don't Ever Wipe Tears Without Gloves is a 2012 three-part Swedish TV drama about the impact of AIDS in Stockholm's gay community in the early 1980s. It is based on the Swedish novelist Jonas Gardell's trilogy with the same name, with each episode covering one of the three novels that are subtitled Love, Disease and Death.

The three-part drama was produced by Sveriges Television, and aired the first time on SVT1 on 8, 15 and 22 October 2012.

In September 2013, it was announced that the BBC had bought the series, and the first episode was aired on BBC Four on 2 December 2013 to mark World AIDS Day.

Episodes 
Episode 1, "Love", focuses on the 19-year-old Rasmus (Adam Pålsson), who after graduation moves from rural Värmland to Stockholm to attend university. As soon as he arrives in Stockholm he begins to seek out the gay community, where he meets and befriends Paul (Simon J. Berger). At a Christmas dinner party in Paul's apartment he eventually meets Benjamin (Adam Lundgren), a young man who is struggling to come to terms with his homosexuality and faith a Jehovah's Witness. Interspersed with the main narrative, there are scenes of Rasmus as a child and the dying Rasmus.

An early scene in the episode shows two nurses dressed in heavy-duty bio-protective clothing in the early 1980s caring for Reine (Kristoffer Berglund); suffering from AIDS. As the nurses tend the pained man, one nurse wipes a tear from his eye, which leads to the second nurse rebuking her afterwards with the sentence that is the title of the series: "Don't ever wipe tears without gloves", reflecting the fear surrounding AIDS at the time.

Episode 2, "Disease", focuses on the relationship between Rasmus and Benjamin after they have moved in together. AIDS has started to spread among their friends, and eventually it also reaches them. When Rasmus is found to be HIV-positive, Benjamin finally decides to tell his parents and church elders that he is homosexual, in order to fully support Rasmus. This leads him to being shunned by the church, and forces his parents to stop all contact if they want to remain in the congregation.

Episode 3, "Death", deals mainly with the deaths of Paul and Rasmus through AIDS. While Paul's funeral is made into a splendid opera, just like his life, Rasmus's parents refuse to accept Benjamin's request concerning Rasmus's funeral, although they had been deeply in love and Benjamin had remained by Rasmus's side throughout. This episode also includes some reflections by the surviving Benjamin over 20 years later.

Main cast 

 Adam Lundgren as Benjamin
 Adam Pålsson as Rasmus
 Simon J. Berger as Paul
 Emil Almén as Seppo
 Michael Jonsson as Lars-Åke
 Christoffer Svensson as Bengt
 Kristoffer Berglund as Reine
 Annika Olsson as Rasmus's mother
 Stefan Sauk as Rasmus's father
 Marie Richardson as Benjamin's mother
 Gerhard Hoberstorfer as Benjamin's father
 Ulf Friberg as Holger
 Björn Kjellman as the narrator / Benjamin, present
 Jonathan Eriksson as Benjamin, 7 years old
 Claes Hartelius as Ove
 Belle Weiths as Benjamin's sister, 5 years old
 Gorm Rembe-Nylander as Rasmus, 7 years old
 Alexi Carpentieri as '80s dude
 Lisa Linnertorp as Elisabeth
 Maria Langhammer as nurse
 Sanna Sundqvist as Madde
 Jennie Silfverhjelm as Rasmus's doctor
 Julia Sporre as Benjamin's sister, 17 years old

Reception 
In Sweden, the drama had a 34% audience share, and received good reviews from the Swedish media. It is credited with raising awareness of HIV and AIDS within Swedish society and has been praised by members of the LGBT community for its depiction of how the AIDS crisis affected Stockholm in the 1980s.

Following the BBC broadcast, Time Out London rated the first episode at 4 out of 5 stars, asking readers to look past the series' name. The Daily Telegraph gave the series opener 4 out of 5 stars in a review, praising the shooting and the use of symbolism. The Independents Ellen E. Jones compared the series with the American miniseries Angels in America in regard to the spread and reaction to HIV/AIDS in the 1980s, finding the series' zeitgeist and character portraits to be strong, though the bildungsroman at the centre of the plot and generic characters were less inventive.

Awards 
 In May 2013, Don't Ever Wipe Tears Without Gloves won the Audience Award at the annual Séries Mania Festival in Paris.
 On 30 August 2013, Don't Ever Wipe Tears Without Gloves won the award Best TV drama at the Swedish Television Award,  (The Crystal).
 The drama was also nominated for the Prix Europa 2013.

See also 
LGBT rights in Sweden

References

External links 

2010s Swedish television series
Gay-related television shows
HIV/AIDS in television
Christianity in fiction
Stockholm in fiction
Swedish drama television series
LGBT-related drama television series
Swedish LGBT-related television series
Television shows set in Sweden
Swedish-language television shows
2010s LGBT-related drama television series
Gay-related films